is a city located in Kumamoto Prefecture, Japan.

The modern city of Kami-Amakusa was established on March 31, 2004, from the merger of the towns of Himedo, Matsushima, Ōyano and Ryūgatake (all from Amakusa District).

As of April 30, 2018, the city has an estimated population of 27,603  and a population density of 217 persons per km². The total area is 126.94 km².

Geography

Climate
Kami-Amakusa has a humid subtropical climate (Köppen climate classification Cfa) with hot, humid summers and cool winters. There is significant precipitation throughout the year, especially during June and July.

Demographics
Per Japanese census data, the population of Kami-Amakusa in 2020 is 24,563 people. Kami-Amakusa has been conducting censuses since 1920.

Notable people
Amakusa Shirō - The leader of the Shimabara Rebellion in 1638.

References

External links

 Kami-Amakusa City official website 

Cities in Kumamoto Prefecture